Into the Maelstrom is the fourth studio album by American psychedelic/progressive rock band Bigelf, released in Europe on March 3, 2014, and in North America on April 1. It is their first album since August 2008, their longest non-album gap, and the first since the departure of long time members Steve Frothingham and Ace Mark. They have since been replaced by guitarist Luis Maldonado and guest drummer Mike Portnoy of Dream Theater fame. The album comes in a limited edition with a bonus CD containing remixes and demo versions, as well as a 2LP vinyl edition with the full album on CD.

Into the Maelstrom is Bigelf's first album released by the record label Inside Out Music, which specializes in progressive rock.

Vocalist, keyboardist and frontman Damon Fox has stated that he was unsure of this future in music, but after keeping talks with Mike Portnoy since his departure from Dream Theater, he was convinced to carry on with Bigelf.

Track listing

Personnel 
 Damon Fox –  vocals, guitar, keyboards
 Luis Maldonado – guitar
 Duffy Snowhill – bass
 Mike Portnoy – drums
 Steve Linsley -Engineer

References 

2014 albums
Bigelf albums
Inside Out Music albums